Events from the year 1909 in Russia.

Incumbents
 Monarch – Nicholas II
 Chairman of the Council of Ministers – Pyotr Stolypin

Events

 20 April - Russian intervention in Persia begins
 11 May - Novonikolayevsk Fire
 24 October - Racconigi Bargain
 29 October - foundation of 
 14 November - first tram line opened in Pskov
 Release of the first Russo-Balt Type C car
 Foundation of Nizhnevartovsk

Births

 18 July - Andrei Gromyko, Minister of Foreign Affairs of the USSR (1957–1985), Chairman of the Presidium of the Supreme Soviet (de jure head of state, 1985–1988)
 21 August - Nikolay Bogolyubov, mathematician and physicist

Deaths

 14 January - Admiral Zinovy Rozhestvensky, Russo-Japanese War commander (born 1848)
 23 February - Nadezhda Trubetskaya, philanthropist (born 1812)
 13 December - Innokenty Annensky, poet, playwright and translator, critic (born 1855)

References

1909 in Russia
Years of the 20th century in the Russian Empire